Motherwell is a town in North Lanarkshire, Scotland

Motherwell may also refer to:

Constituencies
 Motherwell (UK Parliament constituency), a constituency in the Parliament of the United Kingdom
 Motherwell and Wishaw (UK Parliament constituency)
 Motherwell and Wishaw (Scottish Parliament constituency)
 Motherwell North (UK Parliament constituency)
 Motherwell South (UK Parliament constituency)

Transportation
 Motherwell railway station, in Motherwell, Scotland
 Motherwell TMD, a locomotive Traction Maintenance Depot in Motherwell, Scotland
 Motherwell–Cumbernauld line, a railway line

People
 Bishop of Motherwell, the Ordinary of the Roman Catholic Diocese of Motherwell
 Robert Motherwell (1915-1991), an American abstract expressionist painter
 William Motherwell (1797-1835), a Scottish poet
 William Richard Motherwell (1860-1943), a Canadian politician

Other
 Roman Catholic Diocese of Motherwell, an ecclesiastical territory of the Roman Catholic Church in Scotland
 Motherwell College, a further education college based in the Ravenscraig area of Motherwell, Scotland
 Motherwell F.C., a football club based in Motherwell, Scotland
 Motherwell Shopping Centre, an outdoor shopping centre in Motherwell, Scotland
 Motherwell Homestead, a National Historic Site in Canada
 Motherwell, Eastern Cape, South Africa, a township in South Africa